Bindhu is a 1985 Indian Malayalam film, directed and produced by Mookkannoor Sebastian.  The film has musical score by Peter and Reuben.

Soundtrack
The music was composed by Peter and Reuben and the lyrics were written by Bharanikkavu Sivakumar.

References

External links
 

1985 films
1980s Malayalam-language films